KIEE (88.3 FM) is a radio station licensed to serve the community of St. Martinville, Louisiana. The station is owned by Southern Consumers Education Foundation. It airs a variety radio format.

The station was assigned the KIEE call letters by the Federal Communications Commission on August 11, 2011.

References

External links
 Official Website
 

Radio stations in Louisiana
Radio stations established in 2011
2011 establishments in Louisiana
Variety radio stations in the United States
St. Martin Parish, Louisiana